Coyote Wash is a tributary stream of Whiskey Creek in the watershed of the San Juan River and Colorado River. The confluence with Whiskey Creek lies within the Canyon de Chelly National Monument. It is entirely in Apache County, Arizona.

References

Coyote Wash (Whiskey Creek)
Rivers of Arizona